This is a list of Iranian football transfers for the 2013 summer transfer window. Transfers of Iran Pro League & Azadegan League are included.

Rules and regulations 
The Iranian Football Clubs who participate in 2013–14 Iran Pro League are allowed to have up to maximum 38 players (including up to maximum 4 non-Iranian players) in their player lists, which will be categorized in the following groups:
 Up to maximum 21 adult (without any age limit) players
 Up to maximum 9 under-23 players (i.e. the player whose birth is after 21 March 1990).
 Up to maximum 5 under-21 players (i.e. the player whose birth is after 1 January 1993).
 Up to maximum 3 under-19 players (i.e. the player whose birth is after 1 January 1995).

According to Iran Football Federation rules for 2013-14 Football Season, each Football Club is allowed to take up to maximum 6 new Iranian player from the other clubs who already played in the 2012–13 Iran Pro League season. In addition to these six new players, each club is allowed to take up to maximum 4 non-Iranian new players (at least one of them should be Asian) and up to 3 players from Free agent (who did not play in 2012–13 Iran Pro League season or doesn't list in any 2013–14 League after season's start). In addition to these players, the clubs are also able to take some new under-23, under-21, and under-19 years old players, if they have some free place in these categories in their player lists. under-23 players should sign in transfer window but under-21 & under-19 players can be signed during the first mid-season.

Iran Pro League

Damash Gilan 

In:

Out:

Esteghlal 

In:

 
 
 
 

Out:

Esteghlal Khuzestan 

In:

 
 

Out:

Fajr Sepasi 

In:

 
 
 
 
 
 
 

 

Out:

Foolad 

In:

 

 
 

Out:

Gostaresh Foolad 

In:

 

Out:

Malavan 

In:

 
 
 
  
 
 
 
 
 
 

Out:

Mes Kerman 

In:

 
 
 
 

 
 

Out:

Naft Tehran 

In:

 
 
 

 
 
 

Out:

Persepolis 

In:

 
 
 
 
 
 
 
 

 

 

Out:

Rah Ahan Sorinet 

In:

 
 
 
 
 
 
 

 
 
 

 

Out:

Saba Qom 

In:

 
 
 
 
 
 
 
 
 
 
 

Out:

Saipa 

In:

 
 
 
 
 
 
 
 
 
 
 
 

Out:

Sepahan 

In:

 
  
 

 

Out:

Tractor Sazi 

In:

 
 
 
 
 

Out:

Zob Ahan 

In:

 
 
 
 
 
  
  

Out:

Azadegan League

Aboomoslem 

In:

Out:

Aluminium Hormozgan 

In:

 

Out:

Alvand Hamedan 

In:

 
 
 

 
 
 
 
 

Out:

Badr Hormozgan 

In:

Out:

Esteghlal Ahvaz 

In:

 
 
 

Out:

Foolad Yazd 

In:

Out:

Gahar Zagros 

In:

 
  
 

  
 
 
 
 
 
 
 
 
 

Out:

Giti Pasand Isfahan 

In:

 

Out:

Gol Gohar 

In:

Out:

Iranjavan 

In:

Out:

Mes Rafsanjan 

In:

Out:

Naft Gachsaran 

In:

 
 
 
 
 
 
 
 

Out:

Naft Masjed Soleyman 

In:

Out:

Nassaji 

In:

 
 
 

Out:

Nirooye Zamini 

In:

Out:

Padideh Shandiz

In:

Out:

Parseh Tehran 

In:

Out:

PAS Hamedan 

In:

Out:

Paykan 

In:

 

Out:

Rahian Kermanshah 

In:

Out:

Saipa Shomal 

In:

 
 
 
 
 
 

 
  
 
 

Out:

Sanat Naft Abadan 

In:

 
 
 
 

 
 
 
 
 
 
 

 

Out:

Siah Jamegan Khorasan 

In:
 
 
 
 
 
 
 
 

Out:

Shahrdari Bandar Abbas 

In:

Out:

Shahrdari Yasuj 

In:

Out:

Yazd Louleh 

In:

Out:

 
 
 
 
 

 
 
 
 

 

 
  

 
  

  

 
   

Notes
PL Pro League quota.

Notes and references

Football transfers summer 2013
2013
Transfers